Criss Cross and variants thereof may refer to:

Music
Criss Cross Jazz, a jazz label
Criss-Cross, a 1962 jazz album by Thelonious Monk
"Criss Cross", a song by The Rolling Stones from the 2020 deluxe edition of Goats Head Soup

Visual media
Criss Cross (musical), a 1926 musical comedy with music by Jerome Kern
Criss Cross (film), a 1949 film starring Burt Lancaster
CrissCross (film), a 1992 film starring Goldie Hawn
Chris Cross (TV series), a 1993 UK television comedy series
Criss Cross, a 2001 film sequel to the television series Tropical Heat
Crisscross (film), a 2018 Indian Bengali-language film directed by Birsa Dasgupta
Crisscross, the shape more correctly known as:
Greek cross
Crossbuck

Literature
Criss Cross (novel), a novel by Lynne Rae Perkins, recipient of the 2006 Newbery Medal
CRISSCROSS (novel), a 2004 Repairman Jack novel by F. Paul Wilson

Science, technology, and engineering
Level crossings can be colloquially referred to "criss-crosses"
Criss-cross algorithm, a basis-exchange pivoting algorithm for linear programming (and more general problems in mathematical optimization)

Other uses
Criss-Cross (art cooperative), artist's cooperative that formed in Colorado in the early 1970s
Criss Cross (New Kent, Virginia), a registered historic place in New Kent County, Virginia
Crisscross applesauce, a style of sitting, also known as Tailor or Indian style, see Sitting#Positions
Criss-cross squeeze, a squeeze play in bridge

See also 
Kris Kross, an American rap duo
Chris Cross (disambiguation)